Derry Demesne (Diméin Dhoire in Irish) is a townland in the historical Barony of Owney and Arra, County Tipperary, Ireland.

Location
The townland is located to the north of Ballina on the shores of Lough Derg to the west of the Arra Mountains.

Structures of note
The entrance gateway and gate lodge of Derry Castle is situated on the R494 road it is listed as being of architectural, artistic and historical significance.

A ringfort and the ruins of a castle stand on a crannog in Lough Derg which is linked to the shore by a causeway. They are scheduled for inclusion in the next revision of the RMP database (a list of recorded archaeological monuments).

References

Townlands of County Tipperary